Glyceric acid refers to organic compounds with the formula .  It occurs naturally and is classified as three-carbon sugar acid.  It is chiral. Salts and esters of glyceric acid are known as glycerates.

Production
Glyceric acid is usually produced by oxidation of glycerol. A typical oxidant is nitric acid, but catalytic oxidations have been developed also:

As glycerol is prochiral, the oxidation of the two terminal alcohol groups gives distinct enantiomers of glyceric acid.  Oxidation of both primary alcohols gives tartronic acid:

Biochemistry 
Several phosphate derivatives of glyceric acid, including 2-phosphoglyceric acid, 3-phosphoglyceric acid, 2,3-bisphosphoglyceric acid, and 1,3-bisphosphoglyceric acid, are intermediates in glycolysis. 3-Phosphoglyceric acid is an intermediate in the biosynthesis of the amino acid serine, which in turn can be used in the synthesis of glycine and cysteine.

Glyceric acid occurs naturally in Populus tremula and Ardisia crenata.

References
3
Sugar acids
Alpha hydroxy acids
Vicinal diols
Propionic acids